People's Commissariat for Posts and Telegraphs of the USSR was the central organ of the Soviet Union government that was in charge of the organisation and administration of the different forms of communication including posts. It existed between 1923 and 1932.

History 
In 1922, the Soviet Union was formed. Its founding document stated that, among different areas, "jurisdiction of the Union of Soviet Socialist Republics, as represented by its supreme bodies shall be":

The same document defined that "the Executive Body of the Central Executive Committee of the Union is the Council of People's Commissars of the Union of Soviet Socialist Republics (CPC Union), elected by the Central Executive Committee of the Union for the term of the latter," and it would comprise the People's Commissar for Posts and Telegraphs. In the Council of People's Commissars of the Union republics, the People's Commissariat for Posts and Telegraphs had "an advisory capacity."

Accordingly, after the formation of the Soviet Union, the People's Commissariat for Posts and Telegraphs of the USSR was created in 1923 instead of the similar agency of the RSFSR. Regulations on the new Commissariat were approved by the USSR Central Executive Committee session on 12 November 1923.

In 1924, the People's Commissariat for Posts and Telegraphs set up a mobile postal service, providing it to rural localities. In 1925, an area inhabited by 68% of the USSR population (27% of the population centres) was covered by home delivery of mail. Regular radio broadcasting started in 1924, with radio broadcast stations being established in 1925 in Leningrad, Kiev, Minsk, Nizhny Novgorod, and other cities.

By 1929, the telegraph networks destroyed in the Civil War of 1918–1920 were restored to the pre-World War I level. Further improvement of telegraph communication was aimed at a conversion to letter-printing telegraphs. The first facsimile communications line was opened in 1929. In the same year, an automatic switching system for 6,000 numbers was opened in Rostov-on-Don. In 1930, two regional automatic switching systems were launched in Moscow.

On 17 January 1932, the Commissariat was re-organised and renamed the People's Commissariat for Communications of the USSR.

Philatelic policy 
The Commissariat was the central office responsible for issuing postage stamps of the Soviet Union. In addition to overprinting older issues, the government created new postage stamps. Between 1922 and 1930, there were also stamps meant to raise money for famine relief, child welfare and other charity purposes.

The government also tried to generate money from stamp sales abroad. However, at the beginning this amount was quite small as compared, for example, to the total of 522.6 million rubles for all Soviet exports during 1923–1924. Since 1929, the Soviet government had started paying more attention to this revenue source and selling more stamps abroad. Such sales had both financial and propagandistic objectives.

List of Commissars 
The following chief officers supervised the Commissariat over the years:

See also

References

External links 
 
 

Posts and Telegraphs
1923 establishments in the Soviet Union
1932 disestablishments in the Soviet Union
Soviet Union, Posts and Telegraphs
Communications in the Soviet Union
Soviet 3
Postal history of Russia
Postage stamps of the Soviet Union
Philately of the Soviet Union